Bathyclupea is a genus of perciform fishes belonging to a small family Bathyclupeidae.

Species
There are currently 3 recognized species in this genus:
 Bathyclupea hoskynii Alcock, 1891 (Indian deepsea herring)
 Bathyclupea nikparini Prokofiev, 2014 (Parin's deepsea herring) 
 Bathyclupea schroederi Dick, 1962 (Schroeder's deepsea herring)

References

 
Extant Eocene first appearances